Cornelius Cash Jr. (born March 3, 1952) is an American former basketball player. He was a 6'8" and 215 lbs forward.

Cash played collegiately for the Bowling Green State University.

Cash, a forward, was selected by the Milwaukee Bucks in the second round (24th pick overall) of the 1975 NBA Draft and by the San Diego Sails in the second round of the 1975 ABA draft.

Cash played for the Detroit Pistons (1976–77) in the NBA for six games.

External links

1952 births
Living people
American men's basketball players
Basketball players from Dayton, Ohio
Basketball players from Mississippi
Bowling Green Falcons men's basketball players
Detroit Pistons players
Milwaukee Bucks draft picks
People from Macon, Mississippi
Power forwards (basketball)
San Diego Sails draft picks